Osman Mahamuud, also known as `Uthman III ibn Mahmud, was a Somali king. He led the Majeerteen Sultanate during the 19th century.

Majeerteen Sultanate

The Majeerteen Sultanate was established by Somalis from the Majeerteen Darod clan. Osman Mahamuud was the son of Mahmud V ibn Yusuf, who had ruled the Sultanate from 1844 to 1860. Mahmud fils thereafter assumed the throne, governing under the regal title of Boqor (King). The Majeerteen Sultanate rose to prominence that century under Boqor Osman's guidance.

Majeerteen-British agreement
Due to consistent ship crashes along the northeastern Cape Guardafui headland, Boqor Osman's kingdom entered into an informal agreement with Britain, wherein the British agreed to pay the King annual subsidies to protect shipwrecked British crews and guard wrecks against plunder. The agreement, however, remained unratified, as the British feared that doing so would "give other powers a precedent for making agreements with the Somalis, who seemed ready to enter into relations with all comers."

Majeerteen-Italian treaties
In the late 19th century, all extant Somali monarchs entered into treaties with one of the colonial powers, Britain or Italy, except for Dhulbahante & Darawiish sultan  Diiriye Guure.
In late 1889, Boqor Osman entered into a treaty with the Italians, making his realm an Italian protectorate. His rival Sultan Yusuf Ali Kenadid had signed a similar agreement vis-a-vis his own Sultanate the year before. Both rulers had signed the protectorate treaties to advance their own expansionist objectives, with Boqor Osman looking to use Italy's support in his ongoing power struggle with Kenadid over the Majeerteen Sultanate. In signing the agreements, the rulers also hoped to exploit the rival objectives of the European imperial powers so as to more effectively assure the continued independence of their territories.

The terms of each treaty specified that Italy was to steer clear of any interference in the sultanates' respective administrations. In return for Italian arms and an annual subsidy, the Sultans conceded to a minimum of oversight and economic concessions. The Italians also agreed to dispatch a few ambassadors to promote both the sultanates' and their own interests.

See also
Sultanate of Hobyo
Yusuf Ali Kenadid
Ali Yusuf Kenadid
Mohamoud Ali Shire
Somali aristocratic and court titles

Notes

References

The Majeerteen Sultanates

External links
The Majeerteen Sultanates

Ethnic Somali people
Somali monarchs
19th-century Somalian people
20th-century Somalian people